Paris Texas is an American alternative hip-hop duo founded in Los Angeles, California, in 2018. Its members go by the pseudonyms Louie Pastel and Felix, and their real names are unknown. The duo name is a reference to the 1984 road movie Paris, Texas. Their music has been noted for resembling the work of OutKast, King Krule, and Cities Aviv, among others.

History

2013–2018: Early years 
Louie Pastel and Felix met during freshman year in community college in 2013 after being introduced through a mutual friend, and quickly bonded over their shared love for Florida rapper Robb Banks. "I had a French class with this kid Jesus. Funniest dude I ever met in my life. They had been friends already through high school. I told Jesus I made beats. He was rapping and said he has a friend who raps too", Louie retells in an interview. The two experienced great chemistry from the start, and within a few months, they had begun making music together.

2018–2019: Formation and I'll get my revenge in hell 
In 2018, Louie and Felix officially formed Paris Texas. They put out their debut EP entitled I'll get my revenge in hell in October the same year. It featured six tracks including one interlude and a feature from BBY Kodie.

2021–present: Rebranding, Boy Anonymous, and Red Hand Akimbo 
In February 2021, Paris Texas re-emerged on the scene after scraping most of their previous work off of the Internet—the exception being I'll get my revenge in hell, which has remained available on their SoundCloud profile. With the help of their new manager Mike Ahern (who also manages American pop singer Clairo), they started to re-release older tracks and distribute them onto streaming services. First out was the single "Heavy Metal" on February 17, which later was followed up by the songs "Situations" and "Force of Habit", dropped in March and April respectively. These three tracks were soon revealed to be part of their new EP, Boy Anonymous, which arrived in May 2021 and was praised by critics for its "unmistakable intensity and energy of intention". In September 2021, they surprised fans by releasing yet another single, "Girls like drugs". Red Hand Akimbo arrived merely two weeks later, on October 6, without any notice beforehand.

Discography

EPs 
 I'll get my revenge in hell (2018)
 Boy Anonymous (2021)
 Red Hand Akimbo (2021)

References 

American hip hop groups
Alternative hip hop groups